The twentieth series of the British medical drama television series Holby City began airing on BBC One in the United Kingdom on 2 January 2018, and concluded on 27 December 2018. The series consists of 52 episodes; a decrease from the previous series. Kate Hall serves as the series producer, while Simon Harper continued his role as the executive producer. Fifteen cast members reprised their roles from the previous series. Four actors departed during the series, including long-standing cast member James Anderson (Oliver Valentine). Catherine Russell reprised her role as Serena Campbell from episode six. Throughout the series, multiple characters returned for guest stints, including Zosia March (Camilla Arfwedson), Bernie Wolfe (Jemma Redgrave) and Mo Effanga (Chizzy Akudolu).

Episodes

Production 
The series began airing on Tuesday nights on BBC One from 2 January 2018. Simon Harper continues his role as the executive producer of the show, while Kate Hall serves as the series producer. The series consists of 52 episodes, a decrease since the previous series.

Reception 
Holby City was nominated in the "Best Soap (Evening)" category at the 2018 Digital Spy Reader Awards; it came in last place with 3.8% of the total votes. A prominent storyline of the series, dubbed John Gaskell's (Paul McGann) "reign of terror", was nominated in the Best Soap Storyline category; it came in eleventh place with 3.4% of the total votes. In episode 39, John kills colleague Roxanna MacMillan (Hermione Gulliford). This twist was nominated for Biggest OMG Soap moment and Most devastating Soap Death; in the former, it came in eighth place with 4.8% of the total votes, while in the latter, it came in last place with 3.2% of the total votes. At the 2019 Broadcast Awards, Holby City was shortlisted for the "Best soap or continuing drama" award, losing out to soap opera Coronation Street. Judges on the award panel spotlighted episode 35, "Man Down", which focuses on Sacha's mental health. They praised the episode's "innovative camera techniques and character development".

Cast

Overview 
The twentieth series of Holby City begins with 15 roles receiving star billing, including Guy Henry as chief executive officer and consultant general surgeon Henrik Hanssen, Paul McGann as director of surgical innovations and medicine and consultant neurosurgeon John Gaskell, Bob Barrett as Sacha Levy, a clinical skills tutor, consultant general surgeon and the clinical lead of Keller ward, Hugh Quarshie as consultant general surgeon Ric Griffin, and Rosie Marcel as director of cardiothoracic surgery, consultant cardiothoracic surgeon and clinical lead of Darwin ward Jac Naylor. Hermione Gulliford, meanwhile, portrays consultant neurosurgeon Roxanna MacMillan, James Anderson and Olga Fedori appear as cardiothoracic specialist registrars Oliver Valentine and Frieda Petrenko, David Ames continues his role as Dominic Copeland, a specialist registrar in general surgery. Belinda Owusu and Salma Hoque portray F1 doctors, later F2 doctors, Nicky McKendrick and Meena Chowdhury, and Alex Walkinshaw stars as director of nursing services Adrian "Fletch" Fletcher. Jaye Jacobs appears as staff nurse, and later senior staff nurse, Donna Jackson and Kaye Wragg and Lee Mead feature as staff nurses Essie Di Lucca and Ben "Lofty" Chiltern respectively. Additionally, Jules Robertson continues his semi-regular role as porter Jason Haynes.

Anderson departs his role as Oliver Valentine in episode 13. He confirmed his departure on Twitter after the episode's broadcast, commenting, "It's with a full, heavy heart that I now move on to adventures new." Essie also leaves the series in episode 13. Sasha Morris of Daily Star reported that Wragg had left the cast, but Wragg confirmed on Twitter that it was a break, and Essie returns in episode 28. Marcel confirmed in an interview with Laura-Jayne Tyler of Inside Soap that a main character would be killed off during the series. In episode 39, Roxanna is killed off; the exit was embargoed until transmission to surprise the audience. Producers informed Gulliford when she joined the series that she would be killed off as part of her storyline. John is also killed off in episode 46 when he drowns himself in a lake after a confrontation with Hanssen. Two episodes later, Meena makes her departure after Hoque left the series.

Camilla Arfwedson reprises her role as Zosia March for the opening episode. After taking a break from the serial in the previous series, Catherine Russell returns to her role as consultant general surgeon and clinical lead of the AAU Serena Campbell in episode 6. Marcus Griffiths joins the cast as registrar Xavier "Zav" Duval in episode 8. Jemma Redgrave also left her role as Bernie Wolfe during the previous series, although producer Hall confirmed that she would return when she decided to end her break. Russell confirmed on 6 February 2018 that Redgrave would film several episodes in March, and Bernie returns in episode 24 for two episodes. Redgrave reprises her role again for episodes 49 and 50. Olivia Poulet joins the semi-regular cast as chief executive officer and consultant cardiothoracic surgeon Abigail Tate in episode 14. Abigail makes an off-screen exit in episode 45. Debbie Chazen reprises her guest role as Fleur Fanshawe, now a consultant obstetrician, in episode 25. Chazen last appeared in series 17. In August 2018, it was announced that Chizzy Akudolu would return to the series for two months as consultant cardiothoracic surgeon Mo Effanga, having last appeared in 2017. The following month, it was announced that John Michie would also reprise his role as consultant neurosurgeon Guy Self, over a year since his last appearance. Both characters return in episode 47, the only episode that Guy appears in. Ben Hull also returns to his role as Derwood Thompson in episode 52 for a single episode to aid the end of Mo's guest stint.

The series features several recurring characters, and numerous guest stars. Gruffudd Glyn stars in the two opening episodes as prisoner Danny Fincher. Dana Smit reprises her guest role as Sara Johannsen, the wife of Fredrik Johansson (Billy Postlethwaite), in episode 4. Wanda Ventham stars as Shelaigh Chiltern, the grandmother of Lofty, from episode four. She continued appearing until episode 27, before returning in episode 51. Episode six and seven see the introduction of Greta Allinson (Zoe Croft), a love interest for Jason. Croft later joined the semi-regular cast from episode 21. Macey Chipping appears in five episodes across the series as Fletch's daughter, Evie Fletcher, having last appeared in March 2017. Kai O'Loughlin returns to his role as Mikey Fletcher, Fletch's son, in the series. He appears in episodes 18, 20 and 39. Stanley Rabbetts also appears as Fletch's second son, Theo Fletcher, in episode 31. Darcey Burke appears as Jac's daughter, Emma Naylor-Maconie, in episodes 44 and 47. Poppy Jharka reprises her guest role as Amira Zafar in episodes 11 and 12. Marko Leht was cast as Roman Makarenko, the former boyfriend of Frieda. He appears across three episodes: episode 17, 21 and 22. On 1 February 2018, it was announced that actress Gemma Oaten would reprise her role as nurse Sydney Somers for one episode, having previously appeared in two episodes in the previous series. Sydney stars in episode 20. Oaten later reprises her role again and Sydney appears in episode 50. Julia Deakin returns to the show as Dom's mother, Carole Copeland, in episode 30 for one episode. Donna's child, Mia Barron (Briana Shann), returned to the show for a single appearance in episode 52.

Hall announced that this series would continue to crossover with Casualty. Actress Sara Stewart appears in episode 2 as cardiothoracic surgeon Professor Arianne Cornell, following her appearance in episode 1067 of Casualty. A trailer teasing the show's summer storylines revealed that Casualty character Ethan Hardy, portrayed by George Rainsford, would be guest appearing in an episode in the near future. He appears in episode 28 as part of his storyline about Huntington's disease. Amanda Henderson appeared as her Casualty character Robyn Miller in episode 50.

Main characters 
David Ames as Dominic Copeland
James Anderson as Oliver Valentine
Bob Barrett as Sacha Levy
Olga Fedori as Frieda Petrenko
Marcus Griffiths as Xavier "Zav" Duval
Hermione Gulliford as Roxanna MacMillan
Guy Henry as Henrik Hanssen
Salma Hoque as Meena Chowdhury
Jaye Jacobs as Donna Jackson
Rosie Marcel as Jac Naylor
Paul McGann as John Gaskell
Lee Mead as Ben "Lofty" Chiltern
Belinda Owusu as Nicky McKendrick
Hugh Quarshie as Ric Griffin
Catherine Russell as Serena Campbell
Alex Walkinshaw as Adrian "Fletch" Fletcher
Kaye Wragg as Essie Di Lucca

Recurring characters 
Chizzy Akudolu as Mo Effanga
Jesse Birdsall as Steven Fletcher
Macey Chipping as Evie Fletcher
Sasha Clarke as Hannah Best
Zoe Croft as Greta Allinson
Hannah Daniel as Leah Faulkner
Olivia Poulet as Abigail Tate
Jules Robertson as Jason Haynes
Wanda Ventham as Sheilagh Chiltern

Guest characters 
Camilla Arfwedson as Zosia March
Darcey Burke as Emma Naylor-Maconie
Debbie Chazen as Fleur Fanshawe
Julia Deakin as Carole Copeland
Gruffudd Glyn as Danny Fincher
Amanda Henderson as Robyn Miller
Ben Hull as Derwood Thompson
Poppy Jhakra as Amira Zafar
Marko Leht as Roman Makarenko
John Michie as Guy Self
Kai O'Loughlin as Mikey Fletcher
Gemma Oaten as Sydney Somers
Stanley Rabbetts as Theo Fletcher
George Rainsford as Ethan Hardy
Jemma Redgrave as Bernie Wolfe
Briana Shann as Mia Barron
Dana Smit as Sara Johanssen
Sara Stewart as Arianne Cornell

Notes

References
General

 Final viewing figures: 

Specific

External links
 Holby City at BBC Online
 Holby City at the Internet Movie Database

20
2018 British television seasons